Zenobia is an unincorporated community in Christian, Montgomery, and Sangamon counties in the U.S. state of Illinois.

References 

Unincorporated communities in Christian County, Illinois
Unincorporated communities in Montgomery County, Illinois
Unincorporated communities in Sangamon County, Illinois
Unincorporated communities in Illinois